The diplomatic relations between Israel and Serbia were established on January 31, 1992, when Serbia was part of FR Yugoslavia (Serbia and Montenegro).  Israel has an embassy in Belgrade and Serbia had an embassy in Tel Aviv. Yugoslavia was the second country in Europe to recognize Israel in 1948. The two countries have economic and cultural ties, helped by a sizable community of Jews from the former Yugoslavia in Israel. Serbia agreed to move its embassy to Jerusalem on 4 September 2020 but decided not to after Israeli recognition of Kosovo as a sovereign state.

History

Ever since the 13th century there has been a recorded Jewish community of both Ashkenazi and Sephardic Jews in the city of Belgrade. The first Jews to settle in the city originally arrived from Italy and the city of Dubrovnik, and later on from Hungary and Spain.

The Jewish communities of the Balkans saw significant influx in the 15th and 16th centuries by the arrival of Jewish refugees fleeing the Spanish and Portuguese Inquisitions. Sultan Bayezid II of the Ottoman Empire welcomed the Jewish refugees into his Empire. Jews became involved in trade between the various provinces in the Ottoman Empire, becoming especially important in the salt trade. In the northern province of Vojvodina, which was under Habsburg rule, Jews settled in the 18th century, particularly after the 1782 Edict of Tolerance by the Emperor Joseph II, which gave Jews a measure of religious freedom.

The Jewish community developed substantially before and after World War I following the religious autonomy they have received, and many Jewish educational institutions and synagogues for both the Ashkenazi and Sephardic communities were established. By the year 1939 there were approximately 10,400 Jews living in Belgrade.

Most of the Jews living in Serbia were killed during the Holocaust. During the war, many Jews were given refuge by the Yugoslav Partisans, led by Josip Broz Tito, and many of them fought along their side. Serbian civilians were involved in saving thousands of Yugoslavian Jews during this period. After the war, most of those who survived gradually emigrated to Israel.

According to the 2011 census, there are 578 declared Jews in Serbia, living mainly in Belgrade and Vojvodina.

SFR Yugoslavia and Israel established diplomatic relations in 1948. Until 1952, a total of 7,578 Jews emigrated from Yugoslavia to Israel. During the period, Yugoslavia was mostly neutral in the Arab–Israeli conflict, but maintained ties with Israel, helped by its sizable Jewish emigration.

Yugoslavia severed all diplomatic relations with Israel following the Six-Day War in 1967, and it was following a pro-Arab policy since. After the breakup of Yugoslavia, newly formed FR Yugoslavia renewed the relations on January 31, 1992, seeking for certain international support as it was practically isolated from the international community during the Yugoslav Wars.

Political relations

Government of the Kingdom of Serbia, in exile at the time because of the German-Austrian occupation during the World War I, was the first government to officially endorse the Balfour Declaration which announced the establishment of the Jewish state in Palestine. Serbian diplomat to the United States and Zionist leader David Albala announced the support for the declaration on 27 December 1917. Milenko Vesnić, Serbian ambassador to Paris from 1907 to 1920, in one document referred to the new Jewish state as "Israel", which was the first official mention of that name in the international politics.

According to professor Igor Primoratz: "Since the beginning of the disintegration of Yugoslavia, Israel's political establishment has taken a pro-Serbian stand. Facts that Israel had an embassy in Belgrade since October 1991 and that Serbia was the first among Yugoslavia's successor states to open the embassy in Israel (though ambassador Budimir Košutić will never submit his credentials to the President of Israel due to the UN Security Council sanctions imposed on Belgrade) are just confirming that. Both Israeli public and the press itself as Yad Vashem refused to recognize crimes that Serbs committed in Croatia during the Croatian War of Independence."

On April 28, 2009, Arthur Koll, the Israeli ambassador to Serbia, said that though it had been more than a year since Kosovo unilaterally declared independence, Israel had no intention of recognizing the declaration, and that "Israel is asked from time to time how solid this decision is, but the fact is that Israel's position has not changed throughout this time. The Serbian people and government should appreciate Israel's position, which also demonstrates the friendship between the two states.". In September 2009, during an official visit to Belgrade, Israeli Foreign Minister Avigdor Lieberman also reaffirmed that Israel would not recognise Kosovo, but hoped the issue would be resolved peacefully.

Israel recognized the Republic of Kosovo as an independent sovereign state on 4 September 2020 and the two agreed to establish formal diplomatic relations. On 21 September the ambassador of Israel to Serbia, Yahel Vilan, confirmed that Israel had formally recognized Kosovo on 4 September 2020 saying "There is no doubt whether Israel will recognize Kosovo or not, because Israel already recognized Kosovo on 4 September".

On 9 September 2020, The Jerusalem Post quoted an unnamed source from the Serbian President's office who stated that Serbia would not move its embassy to Jerusalem as it pledged to do by signing the White House Agreement if Israel recognizes Kosovo as an independent state. The source also stated,  “Moreover, this move by Israel would harm the otherwise intimate relationship between Israel and Serbia and it will never be the same. It's that simple”.

Economic ties
Economic ties between Israel and Serbia have been rapidly expanding since 2009, in part due to the abolition of visa restrictions between the two countries in September of that year. On February 1, 2012, Serbian president Boris Tadić noted during a ceremony marking 20 years to the renewal of diplomatic ties that Israeli companies have invested more than a billion euros in infrastructures in Serbia.
 
In October 2009, Serbian Interior Minister Ivica Dačić paid a visit to Israel, during which an agreement was signed between the two governments on cooperation in the fight against crime, illegal trade and abuse of narcotics and psychoactive substances, terrorism and other serious criminal acts.

Tourism

Since the abolition of visa restrictions between the two countries in September 2009, the state of Israel has been promoting Serbian tourism to Israel through the Israeli embassy in Belgrade. These efforts include annual advertisements on billboards and public buses in Belgrade presenting Israel as a sea and sun summer destination under the title "Осети Израел / Oseti Izrael" ("Feel Israel"). In 2011 the Israeli embassy initiated a tourism campaign titled "Ја волим Тел Авив / Ja volim Tel Aviv" ("I Love Tel-Aviv"), which included the construction of a "beach" in Novi Sad meant to simulate a typical beach in the Israeli city of Tel-Aviv and be used as a venue for parties and different activities promoting tourism to Israel. According to the Israeli Central Bureau of Statistics, during 2011 4,700 Serbians visited Israel as tourists, compared to 3,000 in 2010 and 1,400 in 2009. In 2016 15,129 Israeli tourists visited Serbia.

Controversy

Alleged financial and weapon support 
In 1995, Israeli weapons supplies showed up among Serbian militants in Bosnia. However, at the time it was not clear how extensive the supply was, or whether they were provided by state or private arms dealers, or whether the Israeli government had even known or approved of such transfers.

It was subsequently reported that Israel had purposely provided weapons to the Serbs during the Bosnian War, possibly due to the pro-Serbian bias of the government of the time, or possibly in exchange for the Sarajevo Jewish community to make aliyah to Israel. It has been alleged that the Israeli intelligence service, Mossad, was responsible for providing Serbian groups with arms.

Criticism of 1999 NATO bombing 

Israel refused to support the 1999 NATO bombing of Yugoslavia, leading to admonishment from the United States. Ariel Sharon criticised NATO's bombing as an act of "brutal interventionism". In the first detailed Israeli response to the NATO campaign against Belgrade, Sharon said both Serbia and Kosovo have been victims of violence. He said prior to the current Yugoslav campaign against Kosovo Albanians, Serbians were the targets of attacks in the Kosovo province. "Israel has a clear policy. We are against aggressive actions. We are against hurting innocent people. I hope that the sides will return to the negotiating table as soon as possible." During the crisis, Elyakim Haetzni said the Serbs should be the first to receive Israeli aid. "They are our traditional friends," he told Israel Radio." It was suggested that Sharon may have supported the Yugoslav position because of the Serbian people's history of saving Jews during the Holocaust. On Sharon's death, Serbian minister Aleksandar Vulin stated: The Serbian people will remember Sharon for opposing the 1999 NATO bombing campaign against the former Yugoslavia and advocating respect for sovereignty of other nations and a policy of not interfering with their internal affairs.  It was suggested that Israel's pro-Serbian position may have been a result of Serbs saving Jews during the Holocaust, personal memories of which were still present among many older Israeli politicians serving in government at the time such as Tommy Lapid.

Palestinian territories
Israel and Kosovo did not recognize each other until September 4, 2020. This decision is regarded in part due to the possibility of the Palestinian Authority using such a recognition to justify their own unilateral declaration of independence. However, In 2011 Serbia voted to recognize Palestine as UNESCO's 195th member, against Israel's wishes. Belgrade declared that it would not have opposed a resolution recognizing Palestinian sovereignty, had one come before the UN General Assembly.

See also

 Foreign relations of Israel
 Foreign relations of Serbia
 Israel–Kosovo relations
 Israel–Yugoslavia relations

External links
 Israeli embassy in Belgrade
 Serbian Ministry of Foreign Affairs about relations with Israel 
  Serbian embassy in Tel Aviv

References

Israel–Serbia relations
Serbia
Bilateral relations of Serbia
Jewish Serbian history